The Prix Iris for Best Original Music is an annual film award, presented by Québec Cinéma as part of its Prix Iris awards program, to honour the year's best music in films made within the Cinema of Quebec. Unlike some other film awards, which present separate categories for scores and songs, the Prix Iris only presents a single music category inclusive of both types of film music.

Until 2016, it was known as the Jutra Award for Best Original Music in memory of influential Quebec film director Claude Jutra. Following the withdrawal of Jutra's name from the award, the 2016 award was presented under the name Québec Cinéma. The Prix Iris name was announced in October 2016.

1990s

2000s

2010s

2020s

See also
Canadian Screen Award for Best Original Score
Canadian Screen Award for Best Original Song

References

Awards established in 1999
Film music awards
Original music
Quebec-related lists
1999 establishments in Canada